Ronald Stanley Dancer (May 31, 1949 – July 23, 2022) was an American Republican Party politician. He spent nearly 20 years in the New Jersey General Assembly, initially representing the 30th legislative district between 2002 and 2012. He later redistricted to the 12th legislative district in 2012, serving until his death in 2022.

Early life 
Dancer was born on May 31, 1949, to Rachel Young and Stanley Dancer, the latter of whom was a professional harness racer. He attended the Peddie School, Wesley College (majoring in Business Administration) and the Edward J. Bloustein School of Planning and Public Policy at Rutgers University. He also served in the United States Army from 1969 to 1971.
In 1970 Ronald became the youngest driver ever to compete in harness racing’s Hambletonian.

Mayor of Plumsted 
Dancer's first elected office was serving on the Plumsted Township committee. He was chosen as mayor in 1990 and continued to be selected for one-year terms until 2011 when he retired from the committee. He has served on the Ocean County Board of Social Services since 1997 (as Chair), the Ocean County Natural Lands and Farmland Preservation Advisory Committee since 1998 and the Ocean County Senior Services Advisory Council since 2002. He was on the New Jersey Horse Racing Commission from 1999 to 2002. After retiring as mayor, he served as the business administrator for Plumsted Township. For a period of time, he held two elected positions—Plumsted Township committeeperson and Assemblyman. This dual position, often called double dipping, was allowed under a grandfather clause in the state law enacted by the New Jersey Legislature and signed into law by Governor of New Jersey Jon Corzine in September 2007 that prevented dual-office-holding but allows those who had held both positions as of February 1, 2008, to retain both posts.

New Jersey Assembly 
In November 2002, Republican County Committee representatives from the 30th Legislative District (which at the time was made up of portions of Burlington, Mercer, Monmouth, and Ocean counties) chose Dancer to fill the vacancy created by Melvin Cottrell's death; Dancer defeated Howell Township Councilmember Joseph DiBella by a 106–72 margin. He had been re-elected to two year terms four times from the 30th District before winning twice from the 12th District.

Committees 
Agriculture and Natural Resources
Military and Veterans' Affairs
Oversight, Reform and Federal Relations
Tourism, Gaming and the Arts

District 12 
Each of the 40 districts in the New Jersey Legislature has one representative in the New Jersey Senate and two members in the New Jersey General Assembly. The representatives from the 12th District for the 2022—23 Legislative Session are:
 Senator Samuel D. Thompson (R)
 Assemblyman Robert D. Clifton (R)
 Assemblyman Ronald S. Dancer (R)

Personal life and death
Dancer and his wife, Brenda, had two children. He died after a long illness on July 23, 2022, aged 73.

Electoral history

Assembly District 12

Assembly District 30

References

External links
Assemblyman Dancer's legislative web page, New Jersey Legislature
New Jersey Legislature financial disclosure forms
2012 2011 2010 2009 2008 2007 2006 2005 2004
Assembly Member Ronald S. Dancer, Project Vote Smart
USTrotting.com article on Assemblyman Dancer

1949 births
2022 deaths
20th-century American politicians
21st-century American politicians
Mayors of places in New Jersey
Military personnel from New Jersey
Republican Party members of the New Jersey General Assembly
Peddie School alumni
People from Plumsted Township, New Jersey
Politicians from Ocean County, New Jersey
Politicians from Trenton, New Jersey
Place of death missing
Rutgers University alumni
Wesley College (Delaware) alumni